In 2016, Kent County Cricket Club competed in Division Two of the County Championship, the Royal London One-Day Cup and the NatWest t20 Blast. The season was the fifth, and last, in charge for head coach Jimmy Adams and the first for new club captain Sam Northeast, who took over from Robert Key at the end of the 2015 season, having captained the side on the field for much of the season.

Sam Billings continued to be selected for England limited overs squads, although he had to settle for only three appearances in 2016. On 21 February, he played in the second of two T20I matches at the end of the South Africa tour, scoring 5 runs in Johannesburg. Billings was selected in England's squad for the 2016 World Twenty20 in India, but did not play during the tournament other than as a substitute fielder. On 5 July, he featured in the only T20I during Sri Lanka's tour of England. Billings played a single ODI, the final match of three during England's tour of Bangladesh, on 12 October at Chittagong, opening the batting with a useful 62 in a four wicket win.

Sam Northeast won the club's Player of the Year award, having scored over 2,000 runs across all formats for a second successive season.

Squad

Departures
In October 2015, Kent Cricket Academy graduate and England Under-19 wicket-keeper Ryan Davies left the club, signing for Somerset in search of more regular first XI cricket. All-rounder Ben Harmison was released in February after four seasons with Kent. On 18 April 2016, former captain Rob Key announced his retirement from playing. Key had spent his entire career with Kent and captained the side for nine years over two spells. He also represented England at international level, and scored a total of 19,419 first-class runs since his debut in 1998.

Following the end of the season, fast bowlers David Griffiths and Sam Weller were released by Kent, neither having their contracts renewed, whilst 40-year old all-rounder Darren Stevens signed a new one-year contract to extend his time at the county. In October head coach Jimmy Adams also left the county to return to his native Jamaica. After his loan spell, Will Gidman signed a permanent contract with Kent in October 2016 having been released by Nottinghamshire.

Arrivals
Former Hampshire and Gloucestershire wicket-keeper Adam Rouse signed for Kent in January on a two-year contract. Rouse had previously played for Kent's Second XI in 2014, and returned for a trial in April 2015 as cover for Sam Billings. Billings missed almost the first two months of the season due to being drafted by the Delhi Daredevils franchise for the 2016 Indian Premier League season.

In February, Kent announced the signing of two overseas players. First the club announced that South African fast bowler Kagiso Rabada would have a spell with Kent from late June until the end of July, between international commitments. The young bowler impressed during England's tour of South Africa, which had recently concluded. A few days later, the club announced the signing of New Zealand international batsman Tom Latham to play in all three competitions during the season. Latham's last match before joining up with his national team for a tour of Zimbabwe was a T20 fixture against Gloucestershire on 8 July. In 2015, the squad had not featured anyone classified as an overseas player.

After Rouse suffered a hand injury in June, and Billings was called into the England T20 squad, former Sussex wicket-keeper Callum Jackson was signed in early July. Kent would otherwise have been without a wicket-keeper in their County Championship match against Essex at the beginning of the month. Jackson had played as a substitute wicket-keeper during the Championship match at Glamorgan in June following Rouse's injury.

In late July, Kent announced the signing of Will Gidman from Nottinghamshire on a one-month loan deal. The former Gloucestershire all-rounder had recently returned from injury and would be available for four One-Day Cup games and two County Championship matches. Captain Sam Northeast stated that Gidman's signing would bolster the side's resources with Calum Haggett and Fabian Cowdrey unavailable through injury. Having impressed during this spell, Gidman's loan deal was extended for the remaining three matches of the season.

On 19 August, Kent announced the signing of South Africa international fast-bowler Hardus Viljoen as the overseas player for the final four County Championship matches of the season, with the club citing a number of injuries to bowlers over the course the season as the reason for the signing.

Squad list
 Ages given as of the first day of the 2016 County Championship season, 10 April 2016.

County Championship
Kent played 16 County Championship matches in 2016, playing once at home and once away against each of the other eight counties in Division Two. Six home matches were played at the St Lawrence Ground in Canterbury, with one match at both the Nevill Ground in Tunbridge Wells and the County Cricket Ground, Beckenham. The county won five games, drew eight and lost only twice in the Championship, finishing second to Essex County Cricket Club. In previous years a second-place finish would have led to promotion to Division One of the Championship, but 2016 saw a rebalancing of the number of teams in each division and, as a result, only one team was promoted.

Kent's match against Worcestershire at New Road in April was abandoned without a ball bowled due to a water-logged outfield. This match was classed as a draw and five points were awarded to each side.

Durham, who had finished 4th in Division One, were deducted 48 points by the ECB at the end of the season as a result of their financial problems. This resulted in their relegation to Division Two. The ECB announced that Hampshire, who had finished 8th in Division One, would be reprieved from relegation. Kent chairman, George Kennedy, launched an appeal claiming that Kent should be promoted instead of this reprieve for Hampshire given the one-off scenario of the runners-up of Division Two missing out on promotion in 2016. The ECB did not change their decision, meaning that Kent will remain in Division Two for the 2017 season.

Division Two

Matches

Other first-class match
Kent played a three-day match with first-class status against Loughborough MCC University before the start of the County Championship season. Daniel Bell-Drummond scored his maiden first-class double century on day one, but only 6.3 overs were possible on day two due to rain, and the match ended in a draw.

Royal London One-Day Cup
Kent began their 2016 Royal London One-Day Cup campaign with a match against Surrey at the County Ground, Beckenham on Sunday 5 June. They played 8 games in the group stage of the competition, finishing in second place and securing a home quarter-final against Yorkshire. Kent lost the quarter-final by 11 runs, being bowled out chasing Yorkshire's score of 256.

South Group

Matches

Quarter-finals

NatWest t20 Blast
Kent began their t20 Blast campaign in the South Group with a match against Somerset at the St Lawrence Ground, Canterbury on Friday 20 May. They played 14 games in the group stage of the competition, winning six and failing to qualify for the knock-out stages after losing their final two matches. As well as five home matches at Canterbury, a single match was hosted at each of Beckenham and Tunbridge Wells.

South Group

Matches

Statistics

Batting

Source: Cricinfo

Source: CricInfo

Source: CricInfo

Bowling

Source: CricInfo

Source: CricInfo

Source: CricInfo

References

External links
Kent home at ESPN cricinfo
Kent County Cricket Club official site

2016
2016 in English cricket